Duncan Jepson is a British solicitor based in Hong Kong, founder of Project Share, a program for poor youth in Hong Kong, a documentary filmmaker, and novelist.

As of 2021, he is the managing director of Liberty Shared, "a campaign group against modern day slavery" in such industries as fashion and palm oil.

Filmography

Novels
 Emperors Once More (Quercus, 2014)
 All the Flowers in Shanghai (William Morrow, 2011)
 Darkness outside the Night, illustrated by Xie Peng aka Eliparvic Xie by Louisa Lim. National Public Radio. May 29, 2013. Accessed March 3, 2021. (Tabella Publishing, 2012)

References

External links
 

Living people
British activists
British solicitors
21st-century British novelists
British expatriates in Hong Kong
British male novelists
Place of birth missing (living people)
Year of birth missing (living people)
21st-century British male writers